The 2022 World Qualification Event for the World Curling Championships was held from January 18 to 22 at the Kisakallio Sports Institute in Lohja, Finland. The competition originally consisted of sixteen teams divided evenly into men's and women's divisions. The Brazilian Men's Team and the Kazakh Women's Team were removed from the competition schedule days before the tournament due to travel complications, leaving the competition with fourteen teams divided evenly into each division. The top two teams in the men's division qualified to compete at the 2022 World Men's Championship and similarly the top two teams in the women's division qualified to compete at the 2022 World Women's Championship.

On January 17, one day before the competition began, the Czech Republic women's team skipped by Alžběta Baudyšová had to withdraw from the competition due to two positive COVID-19 cases within the team. The Czech Curling Association had the option to send a replacement team to the event, but they declined.

In the men's division, Russia and the Netherlands both qualified for the 2022 World Men's Curling Championship. Russia defeated the Dutch team 6–3 in the first qualification final to earn their spot in the championship. The Netherlands then bounced back with a 9–4 victory over Finland to claim the final spot in the World Men's Championship.

On the women's side, Denmark and Norway both secured spots in the 2022 World Women's Curling Championship. Denmark won 7–6 over the Norwegian team in the first final and then Norway defeated Latvia 8–6 in the second final.

Men

Qualification
Eight men's teams will qualify to participate in the 2022 World Qualification Event, through the following methods:

Note: The Brazilian Men's Team qualified for this event, but they were unable to attend due to travel complications.

Teams
The teams are listed as follows:

Round-robin standings
Final round-robin standings

Round-robin results

All draw times are listed in Eastern European Time (UTC+02:00).

Draw 1
Tuesday, January 18, 9:00

Draw 2
Tuesday, January 18, 14:00

Draw 3
Tuesday, January 18, 19:00

Draw 4
Wednesday, January 19, 9:00

Draw 5
Wednesday, January 19, 14:00

Draw 6
Wednesday, January 19, 19:00

Draw 7
Thursday, January 20, 9:00

Draw 8
Thursday, January 20, 15:00

Draw 9
Friday, January 21, 9:00

Draw 10
Friday, January 21, 15:00

Playoffs

Qualification Game 1
Saturday, January 22, 9:00

Winner qualifies for 2022 World Men's Curling Championship.

Loser drops to Qualification Game 2.

Qualification Game 2
Saturday, January 22, 14:00

Winner qualifies for 2022 World Men's Curling Championship.

Women

Qualification
Eight women's teams will qualify to participate in the 2022 World Qualification Event, through the following methods:

Note: The Kazakh Women's Team qualified for this event, but they were unable to attend due to travel complications. Also, the Czech Women's team couldn't participate in the event due to positive COVID-19 cases on their team.

Teams
The teams are listed as follows:

Round-robin standings
Final round-robin standings

Round-robin results

All draw times are listed in Eastern European Time (UTC+02:00).

Draw 1
Tuesday, January 18, 9:00

Draw 2
Tuesday, January 18, 14:00

Draw 3
Tuesday, January 18, 19:00

Draw 4
Wednesday, January 19, 9:00

Draw 5
Wednesday, January 19, 14:00

Draw 6
Wednesday, January 19, 19:00

Draw 7
Thursday, January 20, 9:00

Draw 8
Thursday, January 20, 15:00

Draw 9
Friday, January 21, 9:00

Draw 10
Friday, January 21, 15:00

Playoffs

Qualification Game 1
Saturday, January 22, 9:00

Winner qualifies for 2022 World Women's Curling Championship.

Loser drops to Qualification Game 2.

Qualification Game 2
Saturday, January 22, 14:00

Winner qualifies for 2022 World Women's Curling Championship.

References

World Qualification Event
International curling competitions hosted by Finland
World Qualification Event
World Qualification Event
Lohja